Holy Family High School was a Roman Catholic parochial high school located in New Bedford, Massachusetts. It was founded in 1891 and was originally staffed by the Sisters of Mercy.

History 
Holy Family High School was founded in 1891 as a part of St. Lawrence, Martyr Parish in New Bedford. It was originally staffed by the Sisters of Mercy, but they left in the 1970s. The school closed in 1985 due to declining enrollment.

Notable alumni
James Joseph Gerrard, Catholic bishop
Don Gillis, longtime Boston sportscaster
Bob Halloran, sportscaster and sports executive

Notable faculty
Arnie Oliver, a soccer player who played for the United States at the first World Cup in 1930, later coached at Holy Family.

List of administration 
The following list was compiled from yearbook information.

Faculty and staff

References 

Private high schools in Massachusetts